Puta 109 is a 2018 Indian Kannada-language crime thriller directed by  Dayal Padmanabhan and starring Naveen Krishna and Karthik Jayaram.

Synopsis

A police officer (Karthik Jayaram) comes to the residence of a crime novelist (Naveen Krishna) for investigation. The police officer has come to investigate the death of the Novelist’s wife who was murdered recently. The Suspect list has everyone from the house maid to a family friend.

The crime novelist patiently answers all the questions but will the police officer get his answer or will it lead to more questions.

What does Puta (Page) 109 have to do with this murder or investigation?

Cast

 Naveen Krishna as a novelist
 Karthik Jayaram as a cop
 Vaishnavi Chandran Menon
 Anupama Gowda
 Sri CrazyMindzz
 Victory Vasu

Production 
The film was shot within a week.

Soundtrack 
The music is composed by  RS Ganesh Narayanan. The title track was rendered by Ranjith and Divya Kupuswamy.

Reception 
A critic from The Times of India opined that "Puta 109 is a commendable effort, given how the film tries to tread unexplored territories in the Kannada film industry". A critic from Bangalore Mirror wrote that "For those with a liking for the offbeat this film is one more on the list of films to watch".

References

External links 

2018 crime thriller films
2010s Kannada-language films
2010s Indian films